Yuan Cao is a Chinese physicist. His research is focused on the properties of two-dimensional materials. He discovered that a stack of two sheets of graphene, cooled to 1.7 K, could act as a superconductor or as an insulator when exposed to an electric field. In 2018, Nature chose him as one of 10 people who mattered that year in science, calling him a "graphene wrangler".

Cao was born in Chengdu in 1996, and he attended Shenzhen Yaohua Experimental School starting in 2007. In 2010 he got into the Special Class for the Gifted Young at the University of Science and Technology of China. In 2014 he started graduate school at Massachusetts Institute of Technology, and he obtained his doctorate in 2020. He did research in Pablo Jarillo-Herrero's group studying graphene. After graduating, he has conducted postdoctoral research at MIT.

See also
 Bilayer graphene

References

External links 
 Official website
 
 Citations at ResearchGate

1996 births
People from Chengdu
Physicists from Sichuan
Massachusetts Institute of Technology alumni
University of Science and Technology of China alumni
Living people